Roy Harrison  (born 30 August 1939) is an Irish former cricketer. A right-handed batsman and right-arm medium pace bowler, he played three times for the Ireland cricket team between 1967 and 1968 including one first-class match.

Playing career

Harrison made his debut for Ireland against Worcestershire in Dublin in June 1967. It was very much an inauspicious debut, as he was dismissed for a duck in both innings. He returned to the Irish side in August the following year, scoring 43 against the Combined Services, his highest score for Ireland. He then played his final match for Ireland against Scotland, which was his only first-class match.

Statistics

In his three matches for Ireland, he scored 59 runs at an average of 11.80.

Post playing career

Harrison has served as president of the Irish Cricket Union since 2006.

He was appointed Member of the Order of the British Empire (MBE) in the 2016 New Year Honours for voluntary service to cricket in Northern Ireland.

Family

Harrison came from a cricketing family. Three of his brothers, Deryck, Garfield and Jim, all played for Ireland, as did his brother-in-law Eddie Bushe and his nephew Jonathan Bushe.

References

External links
CricketEurope Stats Zone profile

1939 births
Living people
Irish cricketers
People from Lurgan
Members of the Order of the British Empire
Cricketers from Northern Ireland